R Muscae  is a yellow-white hued variable star in the southern constellation of Musca. It has a nominal apparent visual magnitude of 6.31, which is near the lower limit of visibility to the naked eye.

This is an F-type supergiant star with a baseline stellar classification of F7 Ib. It is a Classical Cepheid variable ranging from apparent magnitude 5.93 to 6.73 over 7.51 days, while varying between spectral types F7 Ib and G2. The star was suspected of having a detectable companion, but this finding was later disputed.

References

Classical Cepheid variables
F-type supergiants
Musca (constellation)
Durchmusterung objects
110311
061981
4820
Muscae, R